The following is a list of speed records for various types of vehicles. This list only presents the single greatest speed achieved in each broad record category; for more information on records under variations of test conditions, see the specific article for each record category. As with many world records, there may be some dispute over the criteria for a record-setting event, the authority of the organization certifying the record, and the actual speed achieved.

Land vehicles

By type of vehicle

By surface

Rail vehicles

Aircraft

Aircraft speed records are based on airspeed, rather than ground speed.

Noted unofficial records

Watercraft

Spacecraft

In order to unambiguously express the speed of a spacecraft, a frame of reference must be specified. Typically, this frame is fixed to the body with the greatest gravitational influence on the spacecraft, as this is the most relevant frame for most purposes. Velocities in different frames of reference are not directly comparable; thus the matter of the "fastest spacecraft" depends on the reference frame used.

Because of the influence of gravity, maximum velocities are usually attained when a spacecraft is close to its primary body: either just after launch, at a point of closest approach (periapsis), or during the early stages of atmospheric entry.

See also
Orders of magnitude (speed)

References

Vehicle speed
World records
Vehicles